Cesbronite is a copper-tellurium oxysalt mineral with the chemical formula Cu3Te6+O4(OH)4 (IMA 17-C). It is colored green and its crystals are orthorhombic dipyramidal. Cesbronite is rated 3 on the Mohs Scale. It is named after Fabien Cesbron (born 1938), a French mineralogist.

Occurrence 
It was first found in the Bambollita ("La Oriental") mine in the Mexican state of Sonora. It also occurs in the Tombstone District of Cochise County, Arizona and the Tintic District of the East Tintic Mountains, Juab County, Utah. It is often associated with argentian gold, teineite, carlfriesite, xocomecatlite, utahite, leisingite, jensenite and hematite.

See also

List of minerals named after people
List of minerals

References

Copper(II) minerals
Orthorhombic minerals
Minerals in space group 60